Devisetty Vinay Kumar (born 21 April 1977) is an Indian former cricketer. He played 74 first-class matches for Hyderabad between 1996 and 2007.

See also
 List of Hyderabad cricketers

References

External links
 

1977 births
Living people
Indian cricketers
Hyderabad cricketers
Cricketers from Delhi